Elliot M. Sutton (October 13, 1841 - March 5, 1908) was a Vermont businessman and politician. A Democrat, among the offices in which he served was mayor of Burlington (1898-1899) and member of the Vermont Senate (1902-1904).

Early life
Elliot M. Sutton (sometimes spelled "Elliott" and frequently abbreviated E. M. Sutton) was born in Oxford, Connecticut, on October 13, 1841. His family moved to Burlington, Vermont in 1850, and Sutton was educated in the public schools of Burlington and Burlington High School.

Sutton was working as a photographer when he registered for the Union Army draft during the American Civil War. In 1864, he moved to South Carolina, where he purchased a plantation and lived for a year.

By 1865, Sutton had returned to Burlington, where he owned and operated a restaurant, the City Coffee House. He was later involved in several other business ventures, including owning apartments and commercial buildings, working as a real estate broker, and operating a lumber dealership. He also took part in civic activities, including joining the volunteer fire department's Hook and Ladder Company Number 1, of which he served as auditor.  Sutton later sponsored another fire company, which was christened E. M. Sutton Hose Company in his honor.

Anti-prohibition activist
Sutton was both a supporter of the Temperance movement and an opponent of Prohibition. He was investigated on several occasions for violating Vermont's law prohibiting the sale and consumption of alcohol. In August 1867, the city constable searched his home and confiscated three pints of whiskey. Sutton defended himself in a trial before the city recorder and won a dismissal of the charges and return of his liquor.

In January 1869, he was found guilty on four counts of selling liquor at the City Coffee House, and paid an $80 fine. In February 1869, he was convicted of one count, and fined $20. In May 1869, he was again charged for violating the law, and the charges were dismissed. In October 1869, he once again faced charges for selling alcohol at his restaurant. He pleaded guilty and was fined $20.

In August 1873, law enforcement officers searched his home in the early morning hours and discovered a workman leaving the premises with two jugs of liquor. Upon entering Sutton's basement, they found him packing bottles of whiskey for transport and observed him emptying a washtub and another container. Police seized bottles and other supplies and equipment. In January 1874, police again searched Sutton's home, but found nothing incriminating.

In 1882, Sutton paid a $50 fine after pleading guilty to five counts of illegally selling liquor. In 1889, a search of his barn uncovered a secret tunnel with a concealed entrance in the cellar, which led to a hidden storage room. Authorities discovered several containers of high wines, as well as bottles, coloring, flavoring, and other ingredients, all of which they seized. As Vermont began to market itself as a tourist destination, the prohibition on alcohol sales was subject to lax enforcement. For example, by the 1890s Urban A. Woodbury, the owner of Burlington's Van Ness House hotel, was openly serving alcohol.

Political career

Early activity
Sutton developed an interest in worker's rights. He was a member of Burlington's first Workingmen's Union, and served as its president. In September 1867 he was appointed to a committee that attempted to enlarge the organization, first to the rest of Chittenden County, and then statewide.

In the 1860s, Sutton became active in local politics and government as a Democrat, and took part in several of the party's local and state nominating caucuses and conventions. He also served for several years as chairman of the Burlington and Chittenden County Democratic Committees.

In 1874, Sutton was nominated for alderman from Burlington's fifth ward. He won the March election with 212 votes to 170 for Republican candidate S. M. Pope. He was nominated for reelection to a two-year term in 1876. In the general election, Republican E. R. Hard won with 205 votes to 202 for Sutton. He ran again in 1877, and was defeated by Archibald Taylor, 217 to 183.

In 1884, Sutton was again a candidate for alderman, and lost to Republican J. W. Goodell, 235 to 214. In March 1886, he was elected again to the board of aldermen, receiving 292 votes to 191 for J. W. Goodell. In September 1886, Sutton was an unsuccessful candidate for the Vermont Senate, placing fourth in the race for three at-large seats.

In March 1887, Sutton was an unsuccessful candidate for mayor, losing to Republican William W. Henry by a vote of 1084 to 769. In April 1887, he was elected president of the board of aldermen. He completed his term as alderman and board president in April 1888. In 1890, Sutton was the Democratic nominee for mayor and lost to William A. Crombie, 1041 votes to 817. In April 1893, the board of aldermen elected Sutton as street commissioner and he served until May 1896.

In June 1893, Sutton was appointed as U.S. Inspector of Chinese Immigration for Vermont, a position created as part of the Geary Act. He succeeded John Halstead and was based in Richford, near the Canadian border. He served until June 1897, when the position was discontinued.

Mayor of Burlington
Sutton was the Democratic nominee for mayor in March 1898, and defeated Republican Hamilton S. Peck by a vote of 1351 to 1312. His term was marked by a contentious relationship with Burlington's Republicans, who opposed many of his initiatives, including suing to prevent the police chief Sutton appointed from assuming his duties. Sutton's appointment was overturned and the previous chief resumed serving. In March 1899, Sutton was defeated for reelection by Republican Robert Roberts, 1491 to 1464.

Later in 1899, Sutton spoke publicly in opposition to the court decision concerning the chief of police, and was indicted for defaming the Vermont Supreme Court. His appeals against the indictment were overruled in 1901 and the case was remanded for trial. Motions and appeals kept the case active until March 1904, when the State's Attorney of Washington County declined to prosecute and the charge was dismissed.

State Senate
In 1902, Sutton was one of the Democratic nominees for Chittenden County's three at-large seats in the Vermont Senate. In the September general election, Democrats in Chittenden County were aided by the anti-establishment Republican supporters of Percival W. Clement and succeeded in electing Sutton, who was the third-place finisher. He served one term, October 1902 to October 1904. Sutton was a member of the committees on elections and railroads, and chairman of the committee on printing. He was not a candidate for reelection.

Death and burial
In the last three years of his life, Sutton was often in ill health and was cared for by his daughter. He died at her home in Johnson, Vermont on March 5, 1908. Sutton was buried at Lakeview Cemetery in Burlington.

Family
In 1863, he married Martha O'Brien of Burlington. Sutton paid a $7 fine in early 1882 after pleading guilty to assaulting her. She sued for divorce on the grounds of intolerable cruelty, won her case in late 1882 and received both a divorce and the right to resume using her maiden name. In 1886, Sutton married Hattie L. (Ballou) Hurlburt of Worcester, Massachusetts. They were married until September 1907, when Elliot Sutton obtained a divorce on the grounds of desertion.

In January 1884, Sutton had a daughter, Inez, with Alice Guyette. Inez May Sutton (1884-1916) graduated from Edmunds High School in 1902 and became a teacher. In 1905, she married Dr. Lyndhurst P. Holcomb of Johnson. They were the parents of a son, Harold (1906-1976).

Notes

References

Sources

Newspapers

Internet

Books

External links

1841 births
1908 deaths
People from Oxford, Connecticut
Politicians from Burlington, Vermont
19th-century American politicians
Mayors of Burlington, Vermont
Democratic Party Vermont state senators
Burials at Lakeview Cemetery (Burlington, Vermont)